Miles Coverdale (4 August 1846 – 3 April 1898) was an Australian cricketer. He played one first-class match for Tasmania in 1870.

See also
 List of Tasmanian representative cricketers

References

External links
 

1846 births
1898 deaths
Australian cricketers
Tasmania cricketers
Cricketers from Tasmania
People from Richmond, Tasmania